Athena and Phevos (pronounced  and ) were the official mascots of the 2004 Summer Olympics and Proteas was the official mascot of the 2004 Summer Paralympics, both held in Athens, Greece.

Athena and Phevos are one of the few examples of anthropomorphic mascots in the history of the Olympics. According to the official mascot webpage, "their creation was inspired by an ancient Greek doll and their names are linked to ancient Greece, yet the two siblings are children of modern times - Athena and Phevos represent the link between Greek history and the modern Olympic Games."

The Athens 2004 Olympic Organizing Committee claimed that the mascots represented "participation, brotherhood, equality, cooperation, fair play [and] the everlasting Greek value of human scale."

For the Paralympic Games, ATHOC subsequently requested Gogos for the creation of a new mascot along the creative lines of Athena and Phevos. He created Proteas, a seahorse that is to convey the nature of the competitions and the athletes’ constant goal of achieving excellency.

The mascots have been emblazoned on a variety of items for sale, including pins, clothing and other memorabilia.

Design
The mascots were named after the Greek gods Athena and Apollo, Phevos being a transcription of the modern Greek pronunciation of Phoebus, an epithet of Apollo. They were loosely modeled after an archaic Greek terra cotta daidala from the 7th century BC, which was recommended by curators at the National Archaeological Museum.

Controversy

Prior to the Games, a group affiliated with the Societas Hellenica Antiquariorum called the Greek Society of the Friends of the Ancients and a Hellenic polytheistic group called the Committee for the Greek Religion Dodecatheon, devoted to the preservation of ancient Greek culture, sued over the mascots, claiming that they "savagely insult" Classical Greek culture. In a BBC Radio interview on June 26, 2004, Dr. Pan. Marinis President of the Societas Hellenica Antiquariorum said that the mascots:

"mock the spiritual values of the Hellenic Civilization by degrading these same holy personalities that were revered during the ancient Olympic Games. For these reasons we have proceeded to legal action demanding the punishment of those responsible."

The fact that the organizing committee referred to the daidala as dolls has been the cause of some controversy among scholars of Ancient Greek culture, as the daidala were religious artifacts.

See also 

 National Archaeological Museum of Athens

Notes

References
The Beijing 2008 Olympics site notes "their whacking feet, longish necks and puny heads" and reports the garbled mythology as issued by the 2004 Olympics Committee.

2004 Summer Olympics
2004 Summer Paralympics
Olympic mascots
Paralympic mascots
Fictional duos
Athletic culture based on Greek antiquity
Athena
Apollo
Greek culture
Fictional fish
Greek mascots
Fictional characters from Athens
Fictional trios